The splitting of the Moon is a miracle in Muslim tradition attributed to the Islamic prophet Muhammad.

Early traditions supporting a literal interpretation are transmitted on the authority of companions of Muhammad such as ibn Abbas, Anas ibn Malik, Abdullah ibn Masud and others. According to the Indian Muslim scholar Abdullah Yusuf Ali, the Moon will split again when the day of judgment approaches. He says that the verses may also have an allegorical meaning, i.e. the matter has become clear as the Moon. The Quranic verses  were part of the debate between medieval Muslim theologians and Muslim philosophers over the issue of the inviolability of heavenly bodies. The narrative was used by some later Muslims to convince others of the prophethood of Muhammad. It has also inspired many Muslim poets, especially in India.

The Quran and Islamic tradition 

The 54th surah of the Quran, entitled , "The Moon", begins:

Early traditions and stories explain this verse as a miracle performed by Muhammad, following requests of some members of the Quraysh. Most early and medieval Muslim commentators accepted the authenticity of those traditions, which allude to the Moon-splitting as a historical event. The following verse 54:2, "But if they see a Sign, they turn away, and say, 'This is (but) transient magic'" is taken in the support of this view.

The post-classical commentator Ibn Kathir provides a list of the early traditions mentioning the incident: a tradition transmitted on the authority of Anas ibn Malik states that Muhammad split the Moon after the pagan Meccans asked for a miracle. Another tradition from Malik transmitted through other chains of narrations, mentions that Jabal al-Nour was visible between the two parts of the Moon (Mount Nur is located in Hijaz. Muslims believe that Muhammad received his first revelations from God in a cave on this mountain, the Cave of Hira'). A tradition narrated on the authority of Jubayr ibn Muṭʽim with a single chain of transmission says that the two parts of the Moon stood on two mountains. This tradition further states that the Meccan responded by saying "Muhammad has taken us by his magic... If he was able to take us by magic, he will not be able to do so with all people." Traditions transmitted on the authority of ibn Abbas briefly mention the incident and do not provide much details. Traditions transmitted on the authority of Abdullah ibn Masud describe the incident as follows: "We were along with God's Messenger at Mina, that Moon was split up into two. One of its parts was behind the mountain and the other one was on this side of the mountain. God's Messenger said to us: Bear witness to this."

The narrative was used by some later Muslims to convince others of the prophethood of Muhammad. Annemarie Schimmel for example quotes the following from Muslim scholar Qadi Ayyad, who worked in the 12th century:

Other perspectives 
Al-Raghib al-Isfahani, Al-Mawardi and Al-Zamakhshari in their commentaries, in addition to mentioning the miracle, also note that the second half of verse 54:1 can be read as "and the moon will be cleaved", referring to one of the signs of the Islamic end of times.

The Muslim scholar Yusuf Ali provides three different interpretations of the verse. He holds that perhaps all three are applicable to the verse: Moon once appeared cleft asunder at the time of Muhammad in order to convince the unbelievers. It will split again when the day of judgment approaches (here the prophetic past tense is taken to indicate the future). Lastly, he says that the verses can be metaphorical, meaning that the matter has become clear as the Moon.

Some dissenting commentators who do not accept the miracle narration believe that the verse only refers to the splitting of the Moon at the day of judgment. Likewise, M. A. S. Abdel Haleem writes:

The Arabic uses the past tense, as if that Day were already here, to help the reader/listener imagine how it will be. Some traditional commentators hold the view that this describes an actual event at the time of the Prophet, but it clearly refers to the end of the world.

Western historians such as A. J. Wensinck and Denis Gril, reject the historicity of the miracle arguing that the Quran itself denies miracles, in their traditional sense, in connection with Muhammad.

Debate over the inviolability of heavenly bodies 
Quran  was part of the debate between medieval Muslim theologians and Muslims philosophers over the issue of the inviolability of heavenly bodies. The philosophers held that nature was composed of four fundamental elements: earth, air, fire, and water. These philosophers however held that the composition of heavenly bodies were different. This belief was based on the observation that the motion of heavenly bodies, unlike that of terrestrial bodies, was circular and without any beginnings or ends. This appearance of eternity in the heavenly bodies, led the philosophers to conclude that the heavens were inviolable. Theologians on the other hand proposed their own conception of the terrestrial matter: the nature was composed of uniform atoms that were re-created at every instant by God (the latter idea was added to defend God's omnipotence against the encroachment of the independent secondary causes). According to this conception, the heavenly bodies were essentially the same as the terrestrial bodies, and thus could be pierced.

In order to deal with implication of the traditional understanding of the Quranic verse , some philosophers argued that the verse should be interpreted metaphorically (e.g. the verse could have referred to a partial lunar eclipse in which then Earth obscured part of the Moon).

Literature 
This tradition has inspired many Muslim poets, especially in India. In poetical language Muhammad is sometimes equated with the Sun or the morning light. As such, part of a poem from Sana'i, a renowned early twelfth century Persian Sufi poet, reads: "the Sun should split the Moon in two". Jalal ad-Din Rumi, a renowned Persian poet and mystic, in one of his poems conveys the idea that to be split by Muhammad's finger is the greatest bliss the lowly Moon can hope for and a devoted believer splits the Moon with Muhammad's finger. Elaborating on this idea, Abd ar-Rahman Jami, one of the classical poets and mystics of Persia, plays with the shapes and numerical values of Arabic letters in a complicated way: the full Moon, Jami says, resembles the Arabic letter for M, a circular mīm, with the numerical value 40. When Muhammad split the Moon, its two halves each became like a crescent-shaped nūn (the Arabic letter for N) whose numerical value is 50 each. This would mean that, thanks to the miracle, the value of Moon had increased.

In another place Rumi, according to Schimmel, alludes to two miracles attributed to Muhammad in tradition, i.e. the splitting of the Moon (which shows the futility of man's scientific approach to nature), and the other that Muhammad was illiterate.

NASA photograph

After Apollo mission photographs were published of Rima Ariadaeus in 2016, the 300 km-long rift line on the surface of the Moon, it was claimed by Muslims on some internet sites and social media that this was result of the splitting mentioned in the Quran. In 2010, NASA scientist Brad Bailey was asked  about this and replied "My recommendation is to not believe everything you read on the internet. Peer-reviewed papers are the only scientifically valid sources of information out there. No current scientific evidence reports that the Moon was split into two (or more) parts and then reassembled at any point in the past."

See also
 Legend of Cheraman Perumals
 Islamic view of miracles
 Musa's splitting the sea, for the miracle of splitting the Red Sea, as told in the Quran
 Muhammad in Mecca
 Rille

References

Miracles attributed to Muhammad
Moon myths